Sir Thomas Cambell (c. 1536 – 13 February 1614) was an English merchant who was Lord Mayor of London in 1609.

Life
Cambell was a city of London merchant and a member of the Worshipful Company of Ironmongers. He was auditor for the city from 1584 to 1586, from 1588 to 1590 and from 1596 to 1598 and member of the committee of the East India Company from 1599 to 1600. On 14 November 1599 he was elected an alderman of the City of London for Bridge Without ward and elected Sheriff of London for 1602. In 1601 he became a member of the committee of the East India Company again until 1607 and was governor of the East India Company for 1603 and 1604. He was knighted on 26 July 1603. In 1604 he was Master of the Ironmongers Company. In 1609, he was elected Lord Mayor of London, and organised a pageant for Henry Frederick, Prince of Wales on the Thames called London's Love to Prince Henry.

He became alderman for Bread Street in 1610 and for Coleman Street in 1611. In 1613 he was Master of the Ironmongers Company again.

Family
Cambell married Alice Bugle, daughter of Edward Bugle, merchant of London. He was the father of James Cambell Lord Mayor in 1629 and Robert Cambell  who was father of two baronets. His daughters married John Gore, Christopher Clitherow and Anthony Abdy.

References

1530s births
1614 deaths
Year of birth uncertain
Sheriffs of the City of London
17th-century lord mayors of London
English merchants
Directors of the British East India Company
16th-century English businesspeople
17th-century English businesspeople
Masters of the Worshipful Company of Ironmongers